Comatricha nigra is a widespread species of slime molds in the family Amaurochaetaceae. It grows on decayed wood on the forest floor. The sporangium reaches a total height of 2-8 mm while the black, hair-like stalk is usually 2 to 6 times the length of the sporangium The color of the sporangium varies as a function of its stage of development, from translucent white, to pink, bright red, and eventually black.

References 

Amoebozoa species
Myxogastria